Qareh Shaban (also Romanized as Qareh Sha‘bān; also known as Ghareh Sha’ban, Kara-Shaban, and Qara Shābān) is a village in Gowharan Rural District, in the Central District of Khoy County, West Azerbaijan Province, Iran. At the 2006 census, its population was 705, in 175 families.

References 

Populated places in Khoy County